Escape Goat is a puzzle-platform game developed and published by independent developer MagicalTimeBean, for the Xbox 360, Microsoft Windows, OS X, Linux, and Nintendo Switch.

Gameplay 
The game is played by guiding a goat through various rooms, in attempt to have them escape a prison. there are several objects that can assist or hinder the goats progress.

Goat abilities 
Z - the goat performs a jump. the jump height can be altered by how long the Z key is held, but the jump height maxes out around 4-5 blocks

Z while in the air - this causes the goat to perform a jump, with the same traits as a normal one, other than the fact that it can only be done once before you have to land on the ground to have it reusable

X - this causes the goat to dash forward and destroy any breakable objects it hits. it is useful when you want to avoid buttons or travel quickly

C - this releases a mouse, which will cling to walls and ceilings, while running forward. if coming in contact with ice, the mouse will turn around and continue running in the opposite direction. the mouse can trigger switches, and other objects. the mouse cannot trigger skull switches, which require the goat to trigger them himself. multiple mice cannot be released at the same time, and if the mouse is hurt, it will simply teleport back to the goat, ready to be deployed again. (note, this ability can only be used after level 2 is completed, and you find the mouse)

C while mouse is out - will recall the mouse, making him teleport back to the goat, ready to be deployed again

C + up arrow - launches the mouse upward. it will behave the same as if it was deployed normally

C + down arrow - deploys the mouse, but it stays in one place, presumably sleeping

V - if the player has collected a Magic Hat, and the mouse is deployed, the goat and mouse will switch places. note that this causes the mouse to stand still in its new location, and the Magic Hat powerup disappears when going to a new level

arrow keys- the left and right keys cause the goat to move left and right respectively. up arrow key causes the goat to enter a door it is touching. down arrow key is used with C to lay the mouse in place

Objects 
Block - the most basic object, coming in 4 varieties.

Wood block - behavior similar to the block, but is destroyed by buzzsaws, and the goat dashing into it

Stone - similar behavior to the block, but will fall, and can be pushed by track and gear blocks

crate - similar behavior to the stone, but has the weaknesses of a wood block

Switch - when touched by the mouse, the goat, or a moving block of some sort, will activate something it is connected to. if there are multiple switches connected to the same thing, only one switch needs to be activated, which will also activate the other switches

spring switch - similar behavior to the switch, but it is only activated while something is on top if it. if there are multiple linked to the same thing, all switches linked to the object have to be activated at the same time

skull switch - similar behavior to the switch, but can only be activated by the goat touching it. can only be activated once

gear block - will push forward one block, moving things that it pushes, when powered

cage block - gear blocks and track blocks can travel through this block, although the mouse, stones, and goat cannot

cage gear block - a gear block, which starts inside a cage block

track block - will follow a track it is placed on. if it is activated, it goes forward. otherwise, it goes back. will push blocks with it

trapdoor - will open if closed when it is activated, and vice versa

block detector - similar to the switch, but will only activate if it is touching a stone, gear block, or track block. Has a delay

Gargoyle - when activated will wait a period of time and than shoot fire. the fire kills living things it touches. this cycle repeats until it is turned off

buzzsaw - will go forward, and like the mouse, can cling to walls and is repelled by ice. will kill any living things it touches, and destroys wood objects

Reaper - will go back and forth on the platform it is on. if it faces toward the goat or the mouse, and they are in front of it, will shoot fire. immune to fire from other reapers

Magic Hat - when touched, this block will disappear and allow the goat to switch places with the mouse, by pressing V

Key - if these exist in a level, you need to touch them all to be able to travel through the door. if they fall off the world, they are automatically used and will act as if the goat touched them. (note, the mouse cannot collect keys)

writing stone - when the goat touches it, it will display a message on the screen. not available in the level editor

Sheep - similar to the writing stone, when touching it, it will create a message on the screen. will give you a key to the door if you encounter one out of the hub area. not available in the level editor

Door - if all keys are collected, you can go to the door and press the up arrow key.

Reception 
Rock, Paper, Shotgun reviewer John Walker recommended the game saying that it was short but enjoyable. GamesRadar's Lucas Sullivan also recommended the game: "With the ability to tackle levels at your own pace, and some masterfully-tuned difficulty, we can guarantee that you’ve never played a better goat-centric game."

Legacy 
A sequel to the game titled Escape Goat 2 was announced in January 2013 and released on March 24, 2014. The game has a new art style, new puzzles, and new magical hats which grant the player character various powers. Escape Goat 2 was published and promoted by Double Fine Productions' publishing label Double Fine Presents. A PlayStation 4 port was released in October 2014.

References 

2011 video games
Double Fine
Indie video games
Linux games
MacOS games
Microsoft XNA games
Puzzle-platform games
Video games developed in the United States
Windows games
Xbox 360 Live Arcade games